Oxyina is a genus of grasshoppers in the subfamily Oxyinae. Current species records (probably incomplete) are from Pakistan, China, and Java.

Species
Species include:
Oxyina bidentata (Willemse, 1925)
Oxyina javana (Willemse, 1955)
Oxyina kashmira Hassan Baba & Usmani, 2021 (Kashmir, with key to species)
Oxyina sinobidentata (Hollis, 1971) - type species (as Oxya sinobidentata)

References

Oxyinae
Acrididae genera
Orthoptera of Asia
Invertebrates of Vietnam